Eva Ryynänen ( Åsenbrygg; 15 June 1915 — 18 October 2001) was a Finnish sculptor known especially for her work in wood.

Career
Ryynänen studied at the Academy of Fine Arts (now part of the University of the Arts Helsinki) from 1934 to 1939.

Her debut solo exhibition was in 1940. Her breakthrough came in 1974, as a result of an exhibition at the Amos Anderson Art Museum in Helsinki, and a national tour following it.

She created in total  500 works, of which approximately 50 are in collections outside Finland.

She is especially known for her numerous wooden sculptures, reliefs and wood carvings housed in many Finnish churches. She also worked extensively with bronze and marble.

Her perhaps most famous creation is the Paateri church in North Karelia, which she built in 1989-1991 entirely of wood. She sculpted everything, including individually designed pews; the altar is an upturned root cluster of a pine tree.

Honours and awards
In 1977, Ryynänen was awarded the  medal of the Order of the Lion of Finland.

In 1998, the honorary title of Professori was conferred on Ryynänen by the President of Finland.

She also received the Kalevala 150th anniversary medal in 1985, as well as numerous other awards.

References

20th-century Finnish sculptors
Finnish women sculptors
People from Vieremä
1915 births
2001 deaths
Pro Finlandia Medals of the Order of the Lion of Finland